The Harare City Council is the local governing body of Harare, the capital of Zimbabwe. It is composed of 46 councillors, each representing a different ward. It is headed by the mayor of Harare, who is assisted by a deputy mayor. The current mayor is Jacob Mafume of the Citizens Coalition for Change (CCC), and the deputy mayor is Luckson Mukunguma of the Movement for Democratic Change Alliance (MDC A).

Current councillors 
The following is a list of Harare city councillors since the 2018 election.

References 

 
City councils
Government of Zimbabwe